is a Japanese football player.

Playing career
Ito was born in Aichi Prefecture on May 12, 1999. He joined J1 League club Shimizu S-Pulse from youth team in 2018.

Career statistics

Last update: May 18th, 2019.

References

External links

1999 births
Living people
Association football people from Aichi Prefecture
Japanese footballers
J1 League players
Shimizu S-Pulse players
Association football defenders